Hope Skylar Rose (born 28 February 2003) is an indoor and field hockey player from the United States, who plays as a forward.

Personal life
Hope Rose was born and raised in Dauphin, Pennsylvania.

Rose is a student at the University of Maryland.

Career

Club hockey
Hope Rose is a current player for the WC Eagles hockey team.

Indoor
In 2019, Rose made her first appearance for the United States Indoor team, during a test series against Croatia in Sveti Ivan Zelina. She then went on to represent the team at the Indoor Croatia Cup, where she won a gold medal.

Rose won her second gold medal with the USA Indoor team in 2021, at the Indoor Pan American Cup in Spring City.

Junior national team
Hope Rose made her debut for the United States U–21 team in 2021, at the Pan American Junior Championship in Santiago.

References

External links

2003 births
Living people
American female field hockey players
Female field hockey forwards
People from Dauphin County, Pennsylvania
21st-century American women